Larisa Roxana Giurgiu (born 5 January 2000), known professionally as Roxen, is a Romanian singer. They rose to prominence after being featured on Romanian producer Sickotoy's "You Don't Love Me" (2019), which reached number three in Romania and received radio airplay in several other countries. The singer's following singles, "Ce-ți cântă dragostea" and "Spune-mi", eventually peaked atop the national chart. Roxen was scheduled to represent Romania in the Eurovision Song Contest 2020 with the song "Alcohol You" before the event's coronavirus disease 2019 (COVID-19)-related cancellation. They were instead internally selected as the country's representative for the 2021 contest with the song "Amnesia", but failed to progress from the first semi-final, finishing in 12th place.

Life and career

2000–2019: Early life and career beginnings
Born Larisa Roxana Giurgiu on 5 January 2000 in Cluj-Napoca, Roxen discovered a passion for music at the age of seven and took singing and piano lessons. Signed by Global Records, the singer was featured on Romanian producer Sickotoy's "You Don't Love Me" in August 2019. The song attained commercial success in Romania, reaching number three on the country's Airplay 100 chart, and being playlisted by radio stations in several territories including France, the United States, Russia and Spain. Roxen's debut solo single "Ce-ți cântă dragostea" released later that year in November peaked at number one in Romania. Music critics have since regarded Roxen's primary genre as being deep house, and compared the singer's music style and appearance to that of Dua Lipa and Billie Eilish. In a București FM interview, Roxen cited Beyoncé as a major inspiration.

2020–present: Eurovision and continued success

In early February 2020, it was reported that Roxen was one of three artists shortlisted to represent Romania at the Eurovision Song Contest 2020; broadcaster Romanian Television (TVR) had collaborated with Global Records for the selection. On 11 February, the singer was revealed by TVR as the Romanian representative. The five songs for Selecția Națională—"Alcohol You", "Beautiful Disaster", "Cherry Red", "Colors" and "Storm"—were released on 21 February. "Alcohol You" emerged as the winner of the national final on 1 March. However, on 18 March, the European Broadcasting Union (EBU) announced the cancellation of the Eurovision Song Contest 2020 due to the pandemic of the coronavirus disease 2019 (COVID-19). Although TVR had considered retaining "Alcohol You" as a song for the Eurovision Song Contest 2021, EBU soon after announced that intended 2020 entries were not eligible for the following year. Roxen was nonetheless internally selected for the 2021 contest.

In June 2020, the singer was hired as the brand ambassador for Romanian box-dye hair color product Loncolor Expert HEMPstyle, appearing on product packagings and in a commercial which prominently featured the Selecția Națională entry "Storm". Starting with the release of "How to Break a Heart" in July, Roxen had been benefiting from a promotional campaign for which Global Records partnered with Warner Music. In October, Roxen scored a second number-one single on the Airplay 100 with "Spune-mi". "Amnesia", Roxen's Eurovision 2021 entry, was selected by an internal jury panel and released on 4 March. It was performed in the first semi-final of the contest on 18 May 2021, but failed to qualify for the final, finishing in 12th place with 85 points. By January 2022, Roxen's collaboration with DMNDS and Strange Fruits Music on "Money Money" (2021) had reached the top ten on music charts in the Commonwealth of Independent States (CIS) and Russia. "Dincolo de Marte" (2021), a collaboration with Randi, was also successful, peaking at number two in Romania in April 2022. "UFO", the song that was placed behind "Amnesia" to represent Romania at Eurovision, was also a number-two hit in Poland and attained a gold certification from the Polish Society of the Phonographic Industry (ZPAV) in the country.

Personal life
At the age of 14, Roxen was diagnosed with lyme disease. Roxen is vegetarian. As of June 2020, the singer resides in Bucharest. At the beginning of the same month, Roxen was allegedly emotionally abused and blackmailed by an ex-boyfriend and obtained a restraining order against him after having made a complaint to the local police. In July 2021, the singer came out as non-binary in a TikTok video, and eventually clarified that they identify with all pronouns. Roxen furthermore stated: "Since I was little, I feel like a boy in a girl's body. In my previous life I was really a boy".

Discography

Singles

As lead artist

As featured artist

Promotional singles

Guest appearances

Music videos

Notes

References

External links 	
	
	
 

2000 births
People from Cluj-Napoca
21st-century Romanian singers
Deep house musicians
Global Records artists
English-language singers from Romania
Romanian non-binary people
Romanian LGBT singers
Living people
Eurovision Song Contest entrants for Romania
Eurovision Song Contest entrants of 2020
Eurovision Song Contest entrants of 2021
Non-binary singers